William Small (1734–1775) was a professor of natural philosophy, College of William and Mary in Virginia.

William Small may also refer to:
William Small (Assemblyman) (1824–?), Scottish-born Wisconsin politician
William Small (basketball), American basketball coach
William Small (Scottish politician) (1909–1978), Scottish Labour Party politician
William Small (trade unionist) (1845–1903), Scottish trade unionist
William B. Small (trade unionist) (1872–1944), his son, Scottish trade unionist
William B. Small (politician) (1817–1878), U.S. Representative from New Hampshire
William N. Small (1927–2016), U.S. Navy admiral
William J. Small (1926–2020), American television executive